Galium uniflorum, common name oneflower bedstraw, is a species of plants in the Rubiaceae. It is native to the southeastern United States from eastern Texas to Maryland.

References

External links
Digital Atlas of the Virginia flora
Southeastern Flora, Galium uniflorum, Oneflower bedstraw
Gardening Europe

uniflorum
Flora of the Southeastern United States
Plants described in 1803
Taxa named by André Michaux
Flora without expected TNC conservation status